Percival Wallace (6 October 1891 – 3 October 1959) was an Australian cricketer. He played 26 first-class cricket matches for Victoria between 1922 and 1927.

See also
 List of Victoria first-class cricketers

References

External links
 

1891 births
1959 deaths
Australian cricketers
Victoria cricketers
Sportspeople from Bendigo